= Mandaue City School for the Arts =

Art school in Mandaue, Philippines

Coordinates: 10°23′05″N 123°55′40″E

Information
- Established: 1998; 28 years ago

The Mandaue City School for the Arts is a Filipino art school that opened in July 1998. The teachers at the school are performers who work in their specific discipline. The school is operated by the Mandaue City government. It only has 1 section per grade level.

Location: Capasanan, Casili, Mandaue City.

The school mixes academic work, with artistic work. Students are taught dance, visual arts, music, and theatre. The students also perform at local events and partake in competitions.
